Jessie Lipscomb, later Jessie Elborne, (13 June 1861 – 12 January 1952) was an English sculptor of the human figure. She worked in Paris in a shared studio workshop in the late 1800s with French sculptor Camille Claudel and two fellow alumni from the Royal College of Art: Amy Singer and Emily Fawcett.

Early life and education
Jessie Lipscomb was born in Grantham, Lincolnshire, England in 1861, the only child of Sidney Lipscomb, a colliery agent and Harriet Arnold, a barmaid. In 1875, the family moved to Peterborough. She attended the Royal College of Art which was at that time called the National Art Training School in South Kensington. She won two prizes from the school: the Queen's Prize in 1882 and a national silver medal in 1883.

Lipscomb visited Paris with a view to continuing her education.  Her instructors, Alphonse Legros and Édouard Lantéri, encouraged Lipscomb to further her studies in Paris where the schooling was more equitable for female students. Two previous graduates of the National Art Training School - Amy Singer and Emily Fawcett - were already living in Paris, and sharing a studio with the young French sculptor Camille Claudel. In January 1884, Claudel's mother Louise wrote to Lipscomb and confirmed the arrangement that she was welcome to lodge with the Claudel family for 200 francs a month.

In 1885, Lipscomb and Claudel were the first women to join Auguste Rodin's all-male atelier to sculpt portions of a major commissioned work: The Burghers of Calais.  Lipscomb was a gifted modeler, excelling in sculpting drapery.

Lipscomb and Claudel spent the summer of 1886, from May through September, in Peterborough with Jessie's family. At this time Jessie was exhibiting a terra-cotta bust Day Dreams (1886) in the Royal Academy, and in Nottingham. Letters from Rodin, addressed to Lipscomb, indicate that Rodin was pursuing Claudel during this time, despite the fact that he had a common law wife.  After the summer in England, both women returned to Paris and continued to work with Rodin for a time before their paths diverged.

The friendship between Lipscomb and Claudel deteriorated and the latter claimed never to want to see Lipscomb again. However, Lipscomb visited Claudel in 1929, where Claudel was confined in the Montdevergues Asylum.  The photograph taken during this visit by Lipscomb's husband is considered to be one of the last known images of Claudel.

Sculpture

From 1885 - 1887 Lipscomb exhibited her artwork annually in exhibitions at both the Royal Academy of Arts and Nottingham Castle Museum.  She exhibited a terra-cotta piece entitled Sans Souci, a plaster portrait of Camille Claudel, and a bust of the Italian model Giganti in 1887.

Personal life
Lipscomb married William Elborne on 26 December 1887 and they settled in Manchester. The couple had four children together and died within eight days of each other in 1952.

In popular culture
Maggie Ritchie's 2015 novel Paris Kiss focuses on the relationship between Jessie Lipscomb and Camille Claudel, and offers a highly fictionalized version of Claudel and Rodin's affair.

References

External links
 Some of her sculptures
 A photograph taken by her of Auguste Rodin and his The Gates of Hell

1861 births
1952 deaths
19th-century British sculptors
19th-century English women artists
20th-century British sculptors
20th-century English women artists
Alumni of the Royal College of Art
English women sculptors
People from Grantham
People from Peterborough